Hochschule für Gestaltung (HfG, lit. "college for design") denotes certain design or art schools in Germany, and may refer to:
 Hochschule für Gestaltung Ulm (Ulm School of Design), founded in 1953 and closed in 1968
 Kunsthochschule Berlin-Weißensee
 Hochschule für Gestaltung Offenbach am Main (since 1970)
 Hochschule für Gestaltung Schwäbisch Gmünd (since 1971)
 Hochschule für Gestaltung Schwäbisch Hall (2000–2013)
 Hochschule für Gestaltung und Kunst Basel
 Hochschule für Gestaltung und Kunst Zürich
 Staatliche Hochschule für Gestaltung Karlsruhe (Karlsruhe University of Arts and Design)

 
Design schools
Art schools in Germany